Brent Noon (born August 29, 1971) is an inactive American Track and Field athlete, known primarily for throwing the Shot Put.

While competing for Fallbrook Union High School, Noon recorded the second-best all-time outdoor mark in the shot put, the closest approach to Michael Carter's NFHS record.  As a senior in 1990, Noon set the California High School record with a throw of 76'2"  After taking a year off, he continued on to the University of Georgia where he won three straight NCAA Men's Outdoor Track and Field Championships.  The University elected Noon to its "Circle of Honor" in 2009 

Noon won the 1995 USA Outdoor Track and Field Championships allowing Noon to compete for the United States at the 1995 World Championships in Athletics, where he finished 5th behind American teammates John Godina and Randy Barnes.  

In 1992, Noon failed to show up at a USATF mandated drug test.  For the offense of missing the test, he was suspended from competition for a 5-week period just before the Olympic Trials.  Noon claimed the instructions were sent to his California address, even though he had moved to Georgia.  While the suspension was reversed, Noon finished 9th at the trials and failed to make the Olympic team.  He blamed mental anguish.  In 1994, Noon won a $1 Million lawsuit against USATF.  He also settled a civil defamation suit against UCLA and then assistant coach Art Venegas, who he claimed had spread rumors of Noon's steroid abuse prior to his high school performances.  It was claimed the year off was related to an attempt to evade drug testing.

In 1996 another drug test revealed methandieone in Noon's sample and in 1997 he was banned from competition for four years, backdated to the 1996 test date.

In 1998 the state Supreme Court has denied  Brent Noon's final attempt to win his five-year legal battle with USA Track & Field.

The Supreme Court denied Noon's petition for review of an appellate court decision in March that reversed a 1994 jury verdict in Noon's favor. That jury had awarded damages to Noon, based on USA Track and Field's two-year suspension of Noon for allegedly testing positive for a banned steroid.

The 4th District Court of Appeal reversed the 1994 jury verdict—which had awarded Noon $983,000 in compensatory damages -- "because we conclude no substantial evidence supports the jury's verdict on any cause of action."

Noon is married to Ali Noon (McKnight), 1995 NCAA Heptathlon runner-up, member of 1999/2000 U.S. Women's Bobsled team, IFBB Figure Pro, and University of Nevada (Reno) Hall of Fame Inductee (2006).  They have two daughters.

References

External links

 Brent Noon in 1990
 Track and Field News blog
 California State Records before 2000

1971 births
Living people
American male shot putters
American sportspeople in doping cases
Doping cases in athletics
Georgia Bulldogs track and field athletes
People from Fallbrook, California
Sportspeople from San Diego County, California
Track and field athletes from California
World Athletics Championships athletes for the United States